TOLO is a commercial television station operated by MOBY Group in Afghanistan. Launched in 2004, it became one of the first commercial stations in the country and laid the foundation for an accessible media outlet by offering a large library of shows. A Dari Persian language channel led and owned by Tajiks, it is Afghanistan's most popular television channel.

The station was launched in Kabul, and as of November 2007 it was broadcasting in 14 cities in Afghanistan on free-to-air and throughout the region by terrestrial antenna and by satellite. Its sister channels are TOLOnews, on air all day and Lemar TV, in the Pashto language.

TOLO was the subject of documentary film in 2012 called The Network, by Eva Orner. The film saw limited international release in 2013.

Reality TV

West Ta East
A reality series based on the lives of socialites who have moved back to Afghanistan, trying to relate to ordinary Afghans in a war-torn country. It was created by Ramiz King, who is also one of the main characters on the show, together with his sister Rohina.

Afghan Star
TOLO’s first game-show reality programme focused on the competition of singing in between talented people of Afghanistan and judged by the superstars of the industry of Kabul. The programme is an adaptation and remake of the Idol Franchise.

The show was the subject of the 2009 documentary film Afghan Star, which won two awards at the 2009 Sundance Film Festival.

Programmes
Raaz Hai Een Khana ("The Secrets of This House") took the Special Award at the Seoul Drama Awards in October 2008. Telecast by TOLO and produced by Kaboora Productions, Raaz Hai Een Khana is the first drama series entirely written, acted, filmed, produced and broadcast by Afghans, for Afghans in Afghanistan. It was selected for a Special Prize amongst 152 entries from 33 countries.

In 2010 TOLO TV began Eagle Four, a police drama often compared to the American series 24; it was partially funded by the U.S. government.

TOLO TV also broadcasts several foreign programs, including Turkish dramas and the Pakistani animated superhero series Burka Avenger.

Attacks
On 21 January 2016, a Taliban suicide car bomber detonated explosives near a bus carrying staffers from TOLO in Darulaman Road in Kabul, killing at least 7 staff members – including 3 female employees - and wounding 26 others. The attack drew widespread global condemnation, with various world countries, activists and media organizations denouncing it as an attack on Afghanistan's freedom of press.

See also
 Television in Afghanistan
 TOLOnews
 Lemar TV
 Moby Media Group

References

External links 
Official site

Television in Afghanistan
Mass media in Kabul
Television channels and stations established in 2004
Television stations in Afghanistan
Persian-language television stations